"Be My Girl" is the 1986 debut single by New Kids on the Block, with lead vocals by Donnie Wahlberg. Written and produced by Maurice Starr, it was the group's first release from their self-titled album New Kids on the Block. Although it received marginal airplay in their hometown of Boston, it was largely ignored nationally and failed to chart on the Billboard Hot 100.

Track listing

7" single
A-side
"Be My Girl" (Vocal) - 3:54
"Be My Girl" (Instrumental) - 3:54

B-side
"Be My Girl" (Extended mix) - 4:50

Charts

Personnel

 Donnie Wahlberg - Lead vocals
Maurice Starr- Backing Vocals, all instruments

References

1986 debut singles
Columbia Records singles
1986 songs
New Kids on the Block songs
Pop ballads
Song recordings produced by Maurice Starr
Songs written by Maurice Starr